Alois Maxwell "Al" Hirt (November 7, 1922 – April 27, 1999) was an American trumpeter and bandleader. He is best remembered for his million-selling recordings of "Java" and the accompanying album Honey in the Horn (1963), and for the theme music to The Green Hornet. His nicknames included "Jumbo" and "The Round Mound of Sound". Colin Escott, an author of musician biographies, wrote that RCA Victor, for which Hirt had recorded most of his best-selling recordings and for which he had spent most of his professional recording career, had dubbed him with another moniker: "The King." Hirt was inducted into The Louisiana Music Hall of Fame in November 2009. He received 21 Grammy nominations during his lifetime, including winning the Grammy award in 1964 for his version of "Java".

Biography
Hirt was born in New Orleans, Louisiana, the son of a police officer. At the age of six, he was given his first trumpet, which had been purchased at a local pawnshop.  He played in the Junior Police Band with friend Roy Fernandez, the son of Alcide Nunez; by the age of 16, Hirt was playing professionally, often with his friend Pete Fountain, while attending Jesuit High School.  During this time, he was hired to play at the local horse racing track, beginning a six-decade connection to the sport.

In 1940, Hirt went to Cincinnati, Ohio, to study at the Cincinnati Conservatory of Music with Dr. Frank Simon (a former soloist with the John Philip Sousa Orchestra). After a stint as a bugler in the United States Army during World War II, Hirt performed with various swing big bands, including those of Tommy Dorsey, Jimmy Dorsey, Benny Goodman, and Ina Ray Hutton.

In 1950, Hirt became first trumpet and featured soloist with Horace Heidt's Orchestra. After spending several years on the road with Heidt, Hirt returned to New Orleans working with various Dixieland groups and leading his own bands. Despite Hirt's statement years later "I'm not a jazz trumpeter and never was a jazz trumpeter", he made a few recordings where he demonstrated his ability to play in that style, during the 1950s with bandleader Monk Hazel, and a few other recordings on the local Southland Records label.

Hirt's virtuoso dexterity and fine tone on his instrument soon attracted the attention of major record labels and he signed with RCA Victor. Hirt posted twenty-two albums on the Billboard charts in the 1950s and 1960s. The albums Honey in the Horn and Cotton Candy were both in the Top 10 best sellers for 1964, the same year Hirt scored a hit single with his cover of Allen Toussaint's tune "Java" (Billboard No. 4), and later won a Grammy Award for the same recording. Both Honey in the Horn and "Java" sold over one million copies, and were awarded gold discs.

Hirt's Top 40 charted hit "Sugar Lips" in 1964 would be later used as the theme song for the NBC daytime game show Eye Guess, hosted by Bill Cullen and originally airing from January 1966 to September 1969.  Hirt was chosen to record the frenetic theme for the 1960s TV show The Green Hornet, by famed arranger and composer Billy May. Based on Nikolai Rimsky-Korsakov's Flight of the Bumblebee from his opera The Tale of Tsar Saltan, it showcased Hirt's technical prowess. In 2003, the recording again gained public attention when it was featured in the film Kill Bill.

From the mid-1950s to early 1960s, Hirt and his band played nightly at Dan's Pier 600 at the corner of St. Louis and Bourbon Street.  The club was owned by his business manager, Dan Levy, Sr.

Hirt opened his own club on Bourbon Street in the French Quarter, which he owned from 1962 to 1983. He also became a minority owner in the NFL expansion New Orleans Saints in 1967.

In 1962, in an effort to showcase him in a different musical setting, Hirt was teamed with arranger and composer Billy May and RCA Victor producer Steve Sholes to record an album titled Horn A Plenty that was a departure from the Dixieland material that he was generally associated with. Covering an eclectic variety of popular, standard and show tunes, it featured a big-band supplemented by timpani, French horns and harp.  He also appeared opposite Troy Donahue and Suzanne Pleshette in the 1962 motion picture, Rome Adventure.

In 1965, Hirt hosted the hour-long television variety series Fanfare, which aired Saturday nights on CBS as the summer replacement for Jackie Gleason and the American Scene Magazine.

Hirt starred along with marching bands from the University of Arizona and Grambling State University at the first Super Bowl halftime show in 1967.

On February 8, 1970, while performing in a Mardi Gras parade in New Orleans, Hirt was injured while riding on a float. It was widely reported that he was struck in the mouth by a thrown brick or a piece of concrete and required 12 stitches to the underside of his upper lip. Factual documentation of the details of the incident is sparse, consisting primarily of claims made by Hirt after the incident although police reported that the 1970 Mardi Gras was one of the worst for trouble, with hundreds arrested for drunkenness and violence. Whatever the actual cause of his injuries, Hirt underwent surgery and made a return to the club scene. This incident was parodied in a Saturday Night Live skit from their second season Mardi Gras special, the "Let's Hit Al Hirt in the Mouth with a Brick Contest".

In 1987, Hirt played a solo rendition of "Ave Maria" for Pope John Paul II's visit to New Orleans. He is referred to in the 1987 film Good Morning, Vietnam, in a broadcast made by Lieutenant Hauk (Bruno Kirby).

Hirt died of liver failure at the age of 76, after having spent the previous year in a wheelchair due to edema in his leg.  He was survived by his wife, Beverly Essel Hirt, and eight children from a previous marriage.

Discography

Singles

Albums

Notes

References

External links

1922 births
1999 deaths
Dixieland revivalist trumpeters
Dixieland trumpeters
Dixieland revivalist bandleaders
Dixieland bandleaders
Jazz musicians from New Orleans
United States Army personnel of World War II
American jazz trumpeters
American male trumpeters
American jazz bandleaders
Grammy Award winners
RCA Victor artists
Monument Records artists
Deaths from liver failure
Burials at Metairie Cemetery
Audio Fidelity Records artists
20th-century American musicians
20th-century trumpeters
20th-century American male musicians
American male jazz musicians
Southland Records artists